Sport Lisboa e Benfica, commonly known as Benfica, is a professional volleyball team based in Lisbon, Portugal, that plays in the Portuguese First Division, where they are the current champions.

Founded in 1939, Benfica have won 10 Portuguese league titles, a record 20 Portuguese Cup and a record 11 Portuguese Super Cup. , Benfica is ranked 23rd in the men's European clubs ranking.

History

Beginning
Founded on 31 May 1939, Benfica is one of the oldest Portuguese volleyball teams. Not having the success and notability of other club sections such as basketball and roller hockey, Benfica's volleyball team won their first title 27 years after being founded.

Road to the first title
From 1965–66 to 1979–80, Benfica played ten Portuguese Cup finals, winning seven. In 1980–81, led by coach Fernando Luís, Benfica finally achieved their first league title, with players such as Luís Quelhas, Manuel Silva, Jorge Infante, José Barros, João Abelho, Pedro Barros, Ilídio Ramos, and already with a young José Jardim appearing in some matches.

Second title and disbandment
In a vibrating match against local rivals Sporting CP, trailing 2–0 at Nave de Alvalade, Benfica, now led by captain José Jardim, alongside teammates Nuno Brites, Luís Quelhas, Nilson Júnior, Eduardo Gallina, Miguel Silva, Márcio Karas, Davidkov, and Radoslav Peytchev, managed to recover the disadvantage and win the match 3–2, claiming their second title.

In the 1993–94 season, then club president Jorge de Brito decided to disband the volleyball team. The following president, João Vale e Azevedo, restarted it in 1996–97 but in the Third Division. Former player José Jardim led Benfica back to the first tier in 2000 with the help of players such as André Cabacinha, Nuno Brites, António Silva, and captain José Fernandez.

Third title
In 2004–05, with coach José Jardim and players such as Brazilians Adriano Lamb, Renato Júnior, André França, Roberto Purificação, André Lukianetz, as well as Portuguese players André Lopes, Carlos Teixeira, António Silva, Rui Guedes, António Seco, José Simões, Bruno Feteira, and Pedro Fiúza, Benfica won the third title for the section, plus their 11th Portuguese Cup.

Between championships
The next season, important players, such as Adriano Lamb, Renato Junior and André França, left, and Benfica only managed to win the Portuguese Cup and reach the quarter-finals of CEV Top Teams Cup.

In the 2006–07 season, Benfica won their third Portuguese Cup in a row and 12th overall.

Three years later, in 2010–11, Benfica signed Hugo Gaspar and Flávio Cruz, who were later joined by Roberto Reis in 2011–12, all players from the Portugal national team. In spite of these investments, the team failed to win the league, coming runners-up to Fonte Bastardo in the first season, and then to Sporting de Espinho in the second one. Nevertheless, Benfica managed to win the Portuguese Cup and Super Cup in 2010–11, and another Portuguese Cup in 2011–12.

Back-to-back titles
In 2012–13, Portuguese international Flávio Cruz left for Espinho and was replaced by Brazilian Willian Reffati. A new setter, Brazilian Rafael "Vinhedo", was also contracted to replace Ronaldo "Royal" and Robert Koch. Benfica started the season by winning their third Super Cup, defeating Espinho 3–0.

On 4 May 2013, Benfica defeated league title holders Espinho 3–2 and conquered their fourth championship, after a seven-year wait and three consecutive second places. After SC Espinho protested at the Portuguese Volleyball Federation on a basis of a technical error, the final match was annulled and scheduled to be replayed on 12 May. Still, Benfica won the replay match 3–1. In the following season, on 4 May 2014, Benfica successfully defended their league title by defeating Fonte Bastardo 3–1; consequently, they secured their first back-to-back titles ever.

On 9 May 2015, Benfica won a third consecutive league title for the first time in their history, winning away 3–0 away to Fonte Bastardo in the fifth and final match (3–2). Moreover, Benfica also won the Portuguese Cup and Super Cup, thus winning all domestic competitions. On 3 October 2015, Benfica won a fifth consecutive Super Cup and became the club with most trophies in that competition (6).

International competition results

Note: Benfica score is always listed first.

Players

Current squad

Out on loan

  José Jardim at Sporting Clube das Caldas
  João Alves at Vitória S.C.

Honours
According to Benfica's official website

Men's

Domestic
 Portuguese Championship
 Winners (10): 1980–81, 1990–91, 2004–05, 2012–13, 2013–14, 2014–15, 2016–17, 2018–19, 2020–21, 2021–22

 Portuguese Cup
 Winners (20) – record: 1965–66, 1973–74, 1974–75, 1975–76, 1977–78, 1978–79, 1979–80, 1989–90, 1991–92, 2004–05, 2005–06, 2006–07, 2010–11, 2011–12, 2014–15, 2015–16, 2017–18, 2018–19, 2021–22, 2022–23

 Portuguese Super Cup
 Winners (11) – record: 1990, 2011, 2012, 2013, 2014, 2015, 2016, 2018, 2019, 2020, 2021

European
 CEV Challenge Cup
 Runners-up: 2014–15

Women's
 Portuguese League
 Winners (9): 1966–67, 1967–68, 1968–69, 1969–70, 1970–71, 1971–72, 1972–73, 1973–74, 1974–75

 Portuguese Cup
 Winners (2): 1972–73, 1973–74

References

External links
  

 
Portuguese volleyball teams
Volleyball
Volleyball clubs established in 1939
1939 establishments in Portugal